Withcott is a rural town and locality in the Lockyer Valley Region, Queensland, Australia.

Geography
Withcott is in the Lockyer Valley.

History 
Withcott State School opened in September 1912. It closed on 30 Apr 1971. It reopened on 31 January 1984 in a new building.

During the 2010–2011 Queensland floods, Withcott suffered extensive damage when a flash flood hit the town on 10 January 2011.

Education 
Withcott State School is a government primary (Prep-6) school for boys and girls at 26 Biggs Road. In 2017, the school had an enrolment of 198 students with 17 teachers (13 full-time equivalent) and 17 non-teaching staff (9 full-time equivalent).

Community groups 
The Upper Lockyer Withcott branch of the Queensland Country Women's Association meets at 4 Biggs Road, adjoining to the Warrego Highway. This was demolished in late 2018 and has since been turned into a public day use facility, containing a bathroom and undercover dining & seating area.

References

External links 

 

Towns in Queensland
Lockyer Valley Region
Localities in Queensland